J. Prabu (born 7 July 1986), is an Indian actor and director. His filmography includes the critically acclaimed blockbusters Marmakaadu, Kandavudan, Gobichettypalayam and Thooya as well as the commercially successful film Kandavudan. He is the son of K. Jaganathan. He has won a first place for his performance in Dance in 2011.

Acting career

Early career: 2009–10

Following his upbringing as the friend of a noted director, J. Prabu debuted under the direction of his arima E. Abdulla in the Kandavudan with fellow debutant, Sherin. Upon release, the film fetched up big reviews and was a blockbuster, following the story of his character, Prabu.

But J. Prabu's breakthrough film was in his brother J. Sridhar.

Personal life

Family
J. Prabu was born to K. Jaganathan as ShankarGanesh. He finished MBA and entered acting.

Filmography

References 

1986 births
Living people
Indian male film actors
Male actors from Tamil Nadu
People from Erode district